Owens may refer to:

Places in the United States
Owens Station, Delaware
Owens Township, St. Louis County, Minnesota
Owens, Missouri
Owens, Ohio
Owens, Virginia

People 

 Owens (surname), including a list of people with the name
 Owens Brown, American politician and activist in West Virginia
 Owens Wiwa, Nigerian doctor and human rights activist

Other uses
Owens v Owens, 2018 divorce case in the Supreme Court of the United Kingdom
Victoria University of Manchester, once known as Owens College (an unofficial name sometimes used by staff and students at UMIST)
Owens Corning, an American glass company

See also
 Owen's (disambiguation)
 Owen (disambiguation)
 Owain (disambiguation)